This is a list of airports that Olympic Airlines, the former Greek national flag carrier, operated:

List

Africa

North Africa 
 
 Benghazi - Benina International Airport
 Tripoli - Tripoli International Airport
 
 Alexandria - Alexandria International Airport
 Cairo - Cairo International Airport

South Africa 
 
 Nairobi - Jomo Kenyatta International Airport
 
 Johannesburg - O. R. Tambo International Airport

Americas

North America 
 
 Montreal - Montréal-Pierre Elliott Trudeau International Airport
 Montreal - Montreal-Mirabel International Airport
 Toronto - Toronto Pearson International Airport
 
 Boston - Logan International Airport
 Chicago - Chicago-O'Hare International Airport
 New York City - John F. Kennedy International Airport

Asia

East Asia 
 
 Tokyo - Narita International Airport

Southeast Asia 
 
 Bangkok - Suvarnabhumi Airport
 Bangkok - Don Mueang International Airport
 
 Singapore - Changi Airport

Southwest Asia 
 
 Tel Aviv - Ben Gurion Airport
 
 Abu Dhabi - Abu Dhabi International Airport
 Dubai - Dubai International Airport
 
 Kuwait City - Kuwait International Airport
 
 Beirut - Beirut–Rafic Hariri International Airport
 
 Dhahran - Dhahran International Airport
 Jeddah - King Abdulaziz International Airport
 Riyadh - King Khalid International Airport

Europe

Central Europe 
 
 Vienna - Vienna International Airport
 
 Frankfurt - Frankfurt Airport
 Berlin -  Berlin Tegel Airport
 Düsseldorf - Düsseldorf Airport
 Munich - Munich Airport
 Stuttgart - Stuttgart Airport
 
 Geneva - Geneva Airport
 Zürich - Zurich Airport

Eastern Europe 
 
 Tirana - Tirana International Airport Nënë Tereza
 
 Sofia - Sofia Airport
 
 Budapest - Budapest Ferenc Liszt International Airport
 
 Bucharest - Henri Coandă International Airport
 
 Moscow - Sheremetyevo International Airport
 
 Belgrade - Belgrade Nikola Tesla Airport

Southern Europe 
 
 Larnaca - Larnaca International Airport
 Paphos - Paphos International Airport
 Nicosia - Nicosia International Airport
 
 Alexandroupolis - Alexandroupolis International Airport
 Astypalaia - Astypalaia Island National Airport
 Athens - Athens International Airport Main Hub
 Athens - Ellinikon International Airport Main Hub (till 2001)
 Chania - Chania International Airport
 Chios - Chios Island National Airport
 Corfu - Corfu International Airport
 Heraklion - Heraklion International Airport
 Ikaria - Ikaria Island National Airport
 Ioannina - Ioannina National Airport
 Kalamata - Kalamata International Airport
 Kalymnos - Kalymnos Island National Airport
 Karpathos - Karpathos Island National Airport
 Kasos - Kassos Island Public Airport
 Kastelorizo - Kastelorizo Island Public Airport
 Kastoria - Kastoria National Airport
 Kavala - Kavala International Airport
 Kefalonia - Kefalonia Island International Airport
 Kithira - Kithira Island National Airport
 Kos - Kos Island International Airport
 Kozani - Kozani National Airport "Filippos"
 Lemnos - Lemnos International Airport
 Leros - Leros Island National Airport
 Milos - Milos Island National Airport
 Mykonos - Mykonos Island National Airport
 Mytilene - Mytilene International Airport
 Naxos - Naxos Island National Airport
 Paros - Paros National Airport
 Preveza - Aktion National Airport
 Rhodes - Rhodes International Airport
 Samos - Samos International Airport
 Santorini - Santorini (Thira) National Airport
 Skiathos - Skiathos Island National Airport
 Skyros - Skyros Island National Airport
 Syros - Syros Island National Airport
 Sitia - Sitia Public Airport
 Thessaloniki - Macedonia International Airport Secondary Hub
 Zakynthos - Zakynthos International Airport
 
 Milan - Linate Airport
 Milan - Milan–Malpensa Airport
 Rome - Leonardo da Vinci–Fiumicino Airport
 
 Lisbon - Lisbon Portela Airport
 
 Barcelona - Barcelona–El Prat Airport
 Madrid - Adolfo Suárez Madrid–Barajas Airport
 
 Istanbul - Istanbul Atatürk Airport

Western Europe 
 
 Brussels - Brussels Airport
 
 Paris 
 Charles de Gaulle Airport
 Orly Airport
 
 Amsterdam - Amsterdam Airport Schiphol
 
 London 
 Gatwick Airport
 Heathrow Airport
 Manchester - Manchester Airport

Oceania 
 
 Melbourne - Melbourne Airport
 Sydney - Sydney Airport

References

Lists of airline destinations
Olympic Airlines